Oak Hill Elementary  may refer to:
St. Cloud School District, Oak Hill Elementary School, St. Cloud, Minnesota, United States
Anne Arundel County Public Schools, Oak Hill Elementary School, Anne Arundel County, Maryland, United States
Austin Independent School District, Oak Hill Elementary School, Austin, Texas, United States
Blue Valley Unified School District, Oak Hill Elementary School, Kansas City Metropolitan Area, Kansas, United States
Fairfax County Public Schools, Oak Hill Elementary School, Fairfax County, Virginia, United States
St. Louis Public Schools, Oak Hill Elementary School, St. Louis, Missouri, United States